Ages Brookside, Kentucky is the name of a post office in Kentucky. The post office is named for the following communities:
Ages, Kentucky
Brookside, Kentucky